Groesbeck High School is a public high school located in the city of Groesbeck, Texas, United States. It is classified as a 3A school by the UIL.  It is a part of the Groesbeck Independent School District located in central Limestone County.   In 2015, the school was rated "Met Standard" by the Texas Education Agency.

Athletics
The Groesbeck Goats competes in volleyball, cross country, football, basketball, tennis, track, baseball, and golf.

State Champions
Girls' basketball
1996 (3A)
Football
1991 (3A)
Girls' track
1996 (3A)

State Finalists
Boys' basketball
1992 (3A)
Girls' basketball
1984 (3A)

Academics
UIL Team Debate Champions
1964 (1A)
UIL Team Spelling Champions
2014 (3A)
UIL State Marching Prelims 2004 Lead By Brian Boecker
2004 (3A)
1st Place Drums Along The Brazos (3A)

References

External links
Groesbeck ISD website

Schools in Limestone County, Texas
Public high schools in Texas